The Ambassador from New Zealand to Poland is New Zealand's foremost diplomatic representative in the Republic of Poland, and in charge of New Zealand's diplomatic mission in Poland.

The embassy is located in Warsaw, Poland's capital city.  New Zealand has maintained a resident ambassador in Poland since 2004. The embassy was officially opened in April 2005.

List of heads of mission

Ambassadors to Poland

Non-resident ambassadors, resident in West Germany
 Doug Zohrab (1973–1975)

Non-resident ambassadors, resident in Austria
 Basil Bolt (1975–1978)
 Tony Small (1978–1982)
 Hugo Judd (1982–1985)
 Don Walker (1985–1990)
 Barry Brooks (1990–1992)

Non-resident ambassadors, resident in Germany
 Richard Grant (1992–1994)
 Gerry Thompson (1994–1998)
 Win Cochrane (1998–2003)
 Peter Hamilton (2003–2004)

Resident ambassadors
 Philip Griffiths (2004–2008)
Penelope Ridings (2008-2011)
Wendy Hinton (2013-2016)
Mary Thurston (2016–present)

See also
 New Zealand–Poland relations

References

 New Zealand Heads of Overseas Missions: Poland.  New Zealand Ministry of Foreign Affairs and Trade.  Retrieved on 2008-03-29.
 http://www.nzembassy.com/poland New Zealand Embassy in Poland official website

Poland, Ambassadors from New Zealand to
Ambassadors